Janet W. O'Brien is an American Democratic politician from Hanover, Massachusetts. She represented the 5th Plymouth district in the Massachusetts House of Representatives from 1991 to 1999.

See also
 1991-1992 Massachusetts legislature
 1993-1994 Massachusetts legislature
 1995-1996 Massachusetts legislature
 1997-1998 Massachusetts legislature

References

Year of birth missing
Year of death missing
Members of the Massachusetts House of Representatives
Women state legislators in Massachusetts
20th-century American women politicians
20th-century American politicians
People from Hanover, Massachusetts